Isaac ibn Sid was a Spanish-Jewish astronomer; he flourished at the Toledo School of Translators in the second half of the thirteenth century.

Biography
From the surname "haḤazzan", given him by Isaac Israeli ben Joseph ("Yesod'Olam," iv. 30), it may be inferred that he was precentor at the synagogue.

Isaac ibn Sid took a leading part in the compilation of the Alfonsine Tables. Isaac Israeli (ib.) states that he saw recorded in Isaac ibn Sid's own handwriting three observations of moon eclipses made by him at the order of Alfonso. In official documents (De Castro, "Bibliotheca," i. 184b) Isaac ibn Sid is termed by Alfonso "our learned Rabbi Çag."

In 1277, Isaac translated from the Arabic a work on the quadrant. His name is also connected with the invention of various instruments (De Castro, l.c. i. 144a, 156a, 157).

See also
Toledo School of Translators

References 
 Heinrich Grätz, Gesch. vii. 115;
 Moritz Steinschneider, Hebr. Uebers. pp. 617 et seq.
 Jewish encyclopedia

External links
  (PDF version)

13th-century Castilian Jews
13th-century astronomers
Jewish scientists
Medieval Spanish astronomers
Medieval Jewish astronomers
Spanish translators
Arabic–Spanish translators
Year of death unknown
Year of birth unknown
13th-century translators
Astronomers of the medieval Islamic world